Ivković or Ivkovic (Cyrillic script: Ивковић) is a South Slavic surname, a patronymic derived from the male given  name Ivko, a diminutive form of Ivan. It may refer to:

Branislav Ivković (born 1952), Serbian presidential candidate in the 2004 election
Dušan Ivković (born 1943), Serbian basketball coach
Dušan Ivković (footballer born 1990) (born 1990), Serbian football player
Milutin Ivković (1906–1943), Serbian football player
Saša Ivković (born 1993), Serbian football player
Slobodan Ivković (1937–1995) Serbian basketball player and coach
Tomislav Ivković (born 1960), Croatian football player
Violeta Ivković (born 1957), Serbian journalist and writer
Vladimir Ivković (born 1929), Croatian water polo player

Croatian surnames
Serbian surnames